Oberti is a surname. Notable people with the surname include:

Daniel Oberti (1945–2009), American artist, sculptor, teacher, lecturer, and mentor
Giuliano Oberti (1901–?), Italian sailor
Massimo Oberti (1901–?), Italian sailor
Paolo Oberti (died 1567), Roman Catholic prelate